Alvin Shrier is Professor in the Department of Physiology and holds the Hosmer Chair in Physiology at McGill University in Montreal, Quebec, Canada.

Biography 
He obtained a Bachelor of Science (B.Sc.) from Concordia University, followed by a Doctor of Philosophy (Ph.D.) from Dalhousie University.

He directs the Cardiac Dynamics Research Laboratory at McGill University.

He was named the Hosmer Chair in Applied Physiology in January 1994.

Research 
His research focuses mostly on understanding the functioning and localization of ion channels as they relate to the heart, as well as the initiation of complex cardiac rhythms.

References 

Living people
Year of birth missing (living people)
Concordia University alumni
Dalhousie University alumni
Academic staff of McGill University